The genus Barteria is in the family Passifloraceae in the major group angiosperms (flowering plants). It contains 8 described species, however, only 6 are accepted.

They are native to Tropical Africa and found in the countries of Angola, Benin, Burkina, Cabinda, Cameroon, Central African Republic, Chad, Congo, Equatorial Guinea, Gabon, Gambia, Ghana, Guinea, Guinea-Bissau, Gulf of Guinea Island, Ivory Coast, Liberia, Mali, Nigeria, Senegal, Sierra Leone, Tanzania, Uganda and Zaïre.

Accepted species
 Barteria dewevrei 
 Barteria fistulosa 
 Barteria laevigata 
 Barteria nigritana 
 Barteria pubescens 
 Barteria solida

Taxonomy
The genus name of Barteria is in honour of Charles Barter (1821 – 1859), was a Scottish gardener and botanist who trained at Kew Gardens in London from 1849 to 1851.
It was first described and published in J. Proc. Linn. Soc., Bot. Vol.5 on page 14 in 1860.

References

Passifloraceae
Malpighiales genera
Taxa named by Joseph Dalton Hooker
Plants described in 1860
Flora of Africa